Susan S. Robfogel is a partner in Nixon Peabody LLP and a member and immediate past chair of the United States Congress Office of Compliance, an independent agency within the U.S. Congress established to administer the application of various civil rights, labor, and workplace laws to Congressional employees. She served as Chair of the Board of Trustees of George Eastman House International Museum of Photography and Film from July 2007 until July 2011.

See also 
Chambers and Partners Profile
Ronald Reagan: Appointment of Susan S. Robfogel as a Member of the Federal Service Impasses Panel
Most Influential Women: Susan Robfogel Rochester Business Journal, June 6, 2003

References

Year of birth missing (living people)
Living people
Cornell Law School alumni
New York (state) lawyers
Smith College alumni
George Eastman House people